Elijah Wilson (born May 14, 1995) is an American professional basketball player who last played for Start Lublin of the Polish Basketball League. He played collegiately for Coastal Carolina before turning professional in 2017. He formerly played in Austria. He won the 2019 ABL championship with Kapfenberg Bulls and afterwards was named the Finals MVP. 

Wilson spent the 2020-21 season with MKS Dąbrowa Górnicza of the Polish Basketball League, averaging 14.8 points per game. On July 19, 2021, he signed with Pallacanestro Varese of the Lega Basket Serie A.

He did not conclude the season with Varese returning to the Poland signing with Start Lublin.

Honours
Kapfenberg Bulls
Austrian Basketball Bundesliga: 2018–19
ABL Finals MVP: 2019

References

External links
 Elijah Wilson at RealGM
 Elijah Wilson at Basketballleague.nl

1995 births
Living people
American expatriate basketball people in Austria
American expatriate basketball people in the Netherlands
American expatriate basketball people in Poland
American men's basketball players
Basketball players from North Carolina
Coastal Carolina Chanticleers men's basketball players
Dutch Basketball League players
Flyers Wels players
Heroes Den Bosch players
Kapfenberg Bulls players
Shooting guards
Sportspeople from Wilmington, North Carolina
Start Lublin players